Janoris Jermain Jenkins (born October 29, 1988), nicknamed "Jackrabbit", is an American football cornerback who is a free agent. He played college football at North Alabama and Florida and was drafted by the St. Louis Rams in the second round of the 2012 NFL Draft. Jenkins also played four seasons for the New York Giants, two seasons for the New Orleans Saints, and one season for the Tennessee Titans.

Early life
Jenkins attended Pahokee High School, and he played for the Pahokee Blue Devils football team and was teammates with Richard Ash and Merrill Noel. In his senior year, Pahokee went 14–0, beating Newberry 53–14 at the Florida Citrus Bowl for the 2008 FHSAA Class 2B State championship. Jenkins was recognized as a first-team Class 2B All-State selection and a Parade magazine All-American.

Rated a four-star recruit by Rivals.com, Jenkins was listed as the sixth-best cornerback prospect in the nation.

College career
Jenkins accepted an athletic scholarship to attend the University of Florida, where he played for coach Urban Meyer's Florida Gators football team from 2008 to 2010. He became just the second true freshman in school history to start at cornerback in the season opener. He was named to College Football News and Sporting News′ Freshman All-American teams.  Despite his strong on-the-field performance for the Gators over three seasons, Jenkins was kicked off the team after he was charged with possession of marijuana in April 2011.

Jenkins subsequently transferred and attended the University of North Alabama for his senior year, after signing an athletic grant-in-aid to play for the North Alabama Lions football team under head coach Terry Bowden.

Collegiate statistics

Professional career
Coming out of North Alabama, Jenkins was projected to be a second round pick by the majority of NFL draft experts and scouts. Prior to the combine, NFL analyst Mike Mayock ranked Jenkins as the second best cornerback in the 2012 NFL Draft. Jenkins received an invitation to the NFL Combine and completed nearly all the combine drills, choosing to only forgo the bench press due to a shoulder injury. On March 9, 2012, he participated at North Alabama's pro day and opted to only perform positional drills for team representatives and scouts. Jenkins was ranked as the third best cornerback in the draft by NFL analyst Mayock and was ranked as the fourth best cornerback by NFLDraftScout.com He received positive reviews for his coverage skills, athletic ability, explosiveness, and ability to read and react to plays. Scouts cited Jenkins' past personal off the field issues, small stature, and possible ability to adapt to the physicality of the pro game as concerns and liabilities.

St. Louis Rams
The St. Louis Rams selected Jenkins in the second round (39th overall) of the 2012 NFL Draft.

2012
On July 24, 2012, the St. Louis Rams signed Jenkins to a four-year, $4.99 million contract, that included $2.93 million guaranteed and a signing bonus of $2.06 million.

Jenkins competed with fellow rookie Trumaine Johnson, veteran Cortland Finnegan, and Bradley Fletcher for the Rams' starting cornerback job throughout training camp. Head coach Jeff Fisher named Jenkins the Rams' starting cornerback for the start of the regular season.

He earned his first career start in his professional regular season debut during the Rams' season-opening 27–23 loss to the Detroit Lions and finished with six combined tackles and a pass deflection, and had his first career interception after picking off Matt Stafford's pass, returning it for 34 yards. In Week 12 against the Arizona Cardinals, Jenkins collected two solo tackles and returned two interceptions for touchdowns after picking off fellow rookie Ryan Lindley. He became the first Rams player to ever return two interceptions for touchdowns in a single regular-season game and helped the Rams defeat the Cardinals, 31–17. On December 16, 2012, Jenkins recorded a season-high eight solo tackles during a 36–22 loss to the Minnesota Vikings.

Jenkins finished his rookie season with a total of 73 combined tackles (64 solo), 14 pass deflections, four interceptions, and four touchdowns in 15 games and 14 starts. Jenkins also appeared as the Rams' punt returner, finishing the season with nine returns for 46 yards and three fumbles. His four defensive touchdowns (3 INTs, 1 fumble recovery) led the NFL that season. Jenkins won the team's Carroll Rosenbloom Memorial Award for his record-setting season. Jenkins also tied an NFL rookie record with three interceptions returned for touchdowns, and tied Chicago Bears' cornerback Charles Tillman for the league lead.

2013
During the Rams' season-opening 27–24 victory over the Arizona Cardinals, he collected four solo tackles and a season-high three pass deflections. On October 13, Jenkins made three combined tackles and had the first sack of his career, on Houston Texans' quarterback T. J. Yates. The following play, Jenkins intercepted Yates for his only pick of the season, helping the Rams defeat the Texans, 38–13. In Week 15, he made a season-high six solo tackles during a 27–16 victory over the New Orleans Saints. Jenkins finished the 2013 season with 61 combined tackles (55 solo), 14 pass deflections, one sack, and one interception in 16 games and 16 starts.

2014
Jenkins resumed his starting cornerback position, teaming up with E. J. Gaines to start the 2014 season. On September 21, he made five solo tackles and intercepted Dallas Cowboys' quarterback Tony Romo, returning it for a 25-yard touchdown as the Rams lost to the Cowboys, 34–31. In Week 7, Jenkins had a season-high nine combined tackles, as the Rams defeated the Seattle Seahawks, 28–26. He missed Weeks 8 and 9 due to a knee injury. On November 23, Jenkins recorded four combined tackles, a pass deflection, and a forced fumble, and intercepted a Philip Rivers' pass for a 99-yard touchdown. The Rams went on to lose to the San Diego Chargers, 27–24. He finished the  season with 59 combined tackles (55 solo), five pass deflections, a forced fumble, two interceptions, and two touchdowns in 14 games and 13 starts. Jenkins, along with teammate Tavon Austin, was named a Pro Bowl Alternate.

2015
On September 27, 2015, Jenkins made a season-high nine combined tackles, a pass deflection, and intercepted Pittsburgh Steelers' quarterback Ben Roethlisberger during a 12–6 loss. The following game, he accumulated five solo tackles and two pass deflections, and intercepted as pass off of Arizona Cardinals' quarterback Carson Palmer during a 24–22 victory. In Week 12, Jenkins had three solo tackles, a pass deflection, and an interception of Andy Dalton, as the Rams lost to the Cincinnati Bengals, 31–7. He finished his final season with the St. Louis Rams with a total of 64 combined tackles (56 solo), 16 pass deflections, and three interceptions in 15 games and 15 starts. Pro Football Focus ranked Jenkins as the 25th-best cornerback in the NFL in 2015 with an overall grade of 80.2. At one point late in the season, Jenkins was ranked as high as the 11th-best cornerback in the NFL.

New York Giants
On March 9, 2016, Jenkins signed a five-year, $62.5 million contract with the New York Giants. The contract included $28.80 million guaranteed and a signing bonus of $10.00 million.

2016
Jenkins was the New York Giants' de facto starting cornerback to begin the regular season, joining a highly touted defensive back field featuring the likes of Dominique Rodgers-Cromartie, Eli Apple, and Landon Collins.

In his debut with the Giants, Jenkins earned three combined tackles and held Dallas Cowboys' wide receiver Dez Bryant to only one catch for 8 yards in the Giants' season-opening 20–19 victory. The following week, he recorded a season-high eight combined tackles and two pass deflections against the New Orleans Saints, while also returning a blocked field goal for a Giants' touchdown. He earned NFC Special Teams Player of the Week for his game against the Saints. On October 9, 2016, Jenkins intercepted Green Bay Packers' quarterback Aaron Rodgers twice, made two tackles and had three pass deflections. Jenkins became the first person to intercept Rodgers twice in just one game at Lambeau Field. On November 14, 2016, Jenkins made six tackles and a pass deflection against the Cincinnati Bengals. He finished the season with 49 combined tackles (44 solo), a career-high 18 pass deflections, one sack, and three interceptions in 15 games and 15 starts. The New York Giants finished the season with an 11–5 record, earning a playoff berth. On January 8, 2017, he played in his first career playoff game, making only one tackle during the Giants' 38–13 loss to the Green Bay Packers in the Wild Card Round.

Jenkins was selected to be a starter in the Pro Bowl for the first time in his career as well as receiving second-team All-Pro honors. He was ranked 54th by his peers on the NFL Top 100 Players of 2017. Jenkins was the first former North Alabama Lions player to be selected to the Pro Bowl since Harlon Hill in 1956.

2017

On October 15, 2017, Jenkins made five combined tackles and intercepted Denver Broncos' quarterback Trevor Siemian, returning it for a 43-yard touchdown in a 23–10 win. On October 31, Jenkins was suspended indefinitely by the Giants for violating team rules. He was reinstated on November 7, 2017, after missing just one game. On November 29, 2017, Jenkins was placed on injured reserve after having ankle surgery, ending his 2017 season. In nine games, he finished with 31 combined tackles, three interceptions (of which two were returned for a touchdown), nine passes defensed, and one forced fumble.

2018
In the 2018 season, Jenkins appeared in all 16 games and recorded 70 combined tackles, two interceptions, 15 passes defensed, and one forced fumble. The Giants finished with a 5-11 record and missed the playoffs.

2019

In Week 4 against the Washington Redskins, Jenkins recorded two interceptions off rookie quarterback Dwayne Haskins in the 24-3 win, earning him NFC Defensive Player of the Week. In Week 6 against the New England Patriots, Jenkins intercepted a pass from Tom Brady and returned it for 62 yards in the 35-14 loss. In Week 8 against the Detroit Lions, Jenkins recorded his fourth interception of the season off Matthew Stafford in the 31-26 loss.

On December 13, Jenkins was waived/injured by the Giants after calling another user a "retard" on Twitter. He finished the 2019 season with the Giants with 54 tackles, 14 passes defended, and four interceptions.

New Orleans Saints
On December 16, 2019, Jenkins was claimed off waivers by the New Orleans Saints. In Week 17 against the Carolina Panthers, Jenkins recorded an interception off a pass thrown by Kyle Allen during the 42–10 win. This was Jenkins' first interception as a member of the Saints. In the NFC Wild Card Round against the Minnesota Vikings, Jenkins recorded eight tackles and forced a fumble on wide receiver Adam Thielen which was recovered by teammate Vonn Bell during the 26–20 overtime loss.

2020
On March 23, 2020, Jenkins signed a two-year, $16.75 million contract extension with the Saints.

In Week 1 against the Tampa Bay Buccaneers, Jenkins recorded his first interception of the season off a pass thrown by Tom Brady and returned it for a 36-yard pick six during the 34–23 win. In Week 11 against the Atlanta Falcons, Jenkins intercepted a pass thrown by Matt Ryan in the fourth quarter to help secure a 24–9 win. In Week 12 against the Denver Broncos, Jenkins intercepted a pass thrown by wide receiver Kendall Hinton during the 31–3 win.

The Saints released Jenkins on March 11, 2021.

Tennessee Titans

On March 19, 2021, Jenkins signed a two-year, $15 million contract with the Tennessee Titans. He played in 14 games with 13 starts, recording 54 tackles, six passes defensed, a forced fumble and an interception.

On March 15, 2022, Jenkins was released by the Titans.

San Francisco 49ers
On November 28, 2022, Jenkins signed with the practice squad of the San Francisco 49ers. His practice squad contract with the team expired after the season on January 29, 2023.

NFL career statistics

Personal life
On June 1, 2009, Jenkins was arrested near a bar by Gainesville police for fighting and resisting arrest after punching a man in the head at approximately 2:00 a.m. Police were forced to use a taser on Jenkins after fighting escalated. When asked why the fight started, Jenkins told police it was because he thought someone was going to steal the gold chain from around his neck.

On April 23, 2011, Jenkins was cited by a Gainesville police officer and charged with misdemeanor marijuana possession.  He was cited for the same violation in January 2011, and paid a $316 fine. Jenkins was arrested in May 2009 during a downtown Gainesville fight that resulted in probation and community service. On April 26, 2011, he was dismissed by the Florida Gators football team, due to his second drug related arrest in three months.

On June 26, 2018, a dead body was found in the basement of Jenkins' New Jersey home, identified as a family friend who had been living at the house. Jenkins' brother was identified as a person of interest.

Jenkins is the cousin of former NFL linebacker Pernell McPhee. He goes by the nickname "Jackrabbit".

References

External links

Florida Gators bio

1988 births
Living people
American football cornerbacks
Florida Gators football players
National Conference Pro Bowl players
New Orleans Saints players
New York Giants players
North Alabama Lions football players
Pahokee High School alumni
People from Pahokee, Florida
Players of American football from Florida
San Francisco 49ers players
Sportspeople from the Miami metropolitan area
St. Louis Rams players
Tennessee Titans players
Under Armour All-American football players